Elke Sommer (born Elke Baronin von Schletz, 5 November 1940) is a German actress. She appeared in numerous films in her heyday throughout the 1960s and 1970s, including roles in The Pink Panther sequel A Shot in the Dark (1964), the Bob Hope comedy Boy, Did I Get a Wrong Number! (1966), Agatha Christie's And Then There Were None (1974), and the British Carry On series in Carry On Behind (1975).

Early life 
Sommer was born in Berlin to Baron Peter von Schletz, a Lutheran minister, and his wife Renata, née Topp. During the Second World War (in 1942), the family was evacuated to Niederndorf, a village near Erlangen, a small university town in Franconia, where she attended a university-preparatory high school. Her father died when she was 14 years old. She passed her college entrance exam. After this, she moved to the UK to work as an au pair (to now actress Vicki Michelle from among other radio, films and TV including BBC sitcom Allo Allo) in order to earn a living and to perfect her English. There, she also received some training as an interpreter.

Career

Discovery 
Sommer was spotted by film director Vittorio De Sica while on holiday in Italy, and she began appearing in films there in 1958. Also that year, she changed her surname from Schletz to Sommer. She soon became a sex symbol and moved to Hollywood in the early 1960s. Sommer became one of the more popular pin-up girls of the time, posing for pictorials in the September 1964 and December 1967 issues of Playboy magazine.

The 1960s 
Sommer became one of the top film actresses of the 1960s. She made 99 film and television appearances from 1959 to 2005, including A Shot in the Dark (1964) with Peter Sellers, The Art of Love (1965) with James Garner and Dick Van Dyke, The Oscar (1966) with Stephen Boyd, Boy, Did I Get a Wrong Number! (1966) with Bob Hope, the Bulldog Drummond extravaganza Deadlier Than the Male (1966), The Wrecking Crew (1968) with Dean Martin, and The Wicked Dreams of Paula Schultz (1968); in each of these films she was the leading lady.

In 1964, she won a Golden Globe award as Most Promising Newcomer Actress for The Prize, a film in which she co-starred with Paul Newman and Edward G. Robinson.

A frequent guest on television, Sommer sang and participated in comedy sketches on episodes of The Dean Martin Show and on Bob Hope specials, made 10 appearances on The Tonight Show Starring Johnny Carson, and was a panelist on the Hollywood Squares game show many times between 1973 and 1980, when Peter Marshall was its host.

The 1970s 
Sommer's films during the 1970s included the thriller Zeppelin, in which she co-starred with Michael York, and a 1974 remake of Agatha Christie's  murder mystery Ten Little Indians. In 1972, she starred in two Italian horror films directed by Mario Bava: Baron Blood and Lisa and the Devil. The latter was re-edited (with 1975 footage inserted) to make a different film titled House of Exorcism. Sommer went back to Italy to act in additional scenes for Lisa and the Devil, which its producer inserted into the film to convert it to House of Exorcism against the wishes of the director.

In 1975, Peter Rogers cast her in the British comedy Carry On Behind as the Russian Professor Vrooshka. She became the Carry On films' joint highest-paid performer, at £30,000; this was an honour that she shared with Phil Silvers (who starred in Follow That Camel).

Most of her movie work during the decade came in European films. After the 1979 comedy The Prisoner of Zenda, which reunited her with Sellers, the actress did virtually no more acting in Hollywood films, concentrating more on her artwork.

Sommer also performed as a singer, recording and releasing several albums.

Later work 
In the 1980s, Sommer hosted a syndicated programme titled The Exciting World of Speed and Beauty.

After the 1990s, Sommer concentrated more on painting than on acting. As an actress, she had worked in half a dozen countries learning the languages (she speaks seven languages) and storing images which she has expressed on canvas. Her artwork shows a strong influence from Marc Chagall.

Sommer was embroiled in a long-running feud with Zsa Zsa Gabor that began in 1984 when both appeared on Circus of the Stars. This had escalated into a multimillion-dollar libel suit by 1993, resulting in Sommer being awarded $3.3 million in damages from Gabor and her husband, Frederick von Anhalt, for defaming her in interviews published in a pair of German publications in 1990.

In 2001, a Golden Palm Star on the Palm Springs Walk of Stars was dedicated to her.

Sommer also provided the voice of Yzma in the German version of The Emperor's New Groove.

Personal life 

In 1964, Sommer married Hollywood columnist Joe Hyams (1923–2008), who was 17 years her senior, in Las Vegas.

They later divorced, and she met Wolf Walther, eight years her junior and the managing director of a luxury hotel, Essex House in New York City. They were married on 29 August 1993 in Franconia. In a 2014 interview, Sommer described how she and Walther met:

I was in New York City starring in Tamara and had to stay there for four months. So, I had to find an apartment but they were excruciatingly expensive, tiny and loud. As I knew the managing director of the Essex House, I wanted to talk to him about renting a room but the hotel had a new managing director, a man by the name of Wolf Walther. So we met. For him, it was love at first sight. For me, it took a little longer, but not much longer. As you may know, Tamara is a play in which the audience follows the actor of their choice, and as you may also know, my husband is 6'5" and hard to miss. I saw him every night in the audience, following me. Every night. And that was the beginning of the greatest love story of my life, still unfolding and getting better by the day.

As of May 2017, Sommer was living in Los Angeles, California.

Selected filmography 

 The Friend of the Jaguar (1959) – Grete
 Men and Noblemen (1959) – Caterina
 Ragazzi del Juke-Box (1959) – Giulia Cesari
 The Death Ship (1959) – Mylene, ein Französisches Mädchen
 The Day the Rains Came (1959) – Ellen
 La Pica sul Pacifico (1959) – Rossana
 Stage Fright (1960) – Evelyne
 Howlers in the Dock (1960) – Giulia Giommarelli
 Heaven, Love and Twine (1960) – Eva
 The Warrior Empress (1960)
 Femmine di lusso (1960) – Greta
  (1961) – Britta
 Daniella by Night (1961) – Daniella
 Don't Bother to Knock (1961) – Ingrid
 Beloved Impostor (1961) – Barbara Shadwell
 Auf Wiedersehen (1961) – Suzy Dalton
 Café Oriental (1962) – Sylvia
 Douce violence (1962) – Elke
 Das Mädchen und der Staatsanwalt (1962) – Renate Hecker
 Un chien dans un jeu de quilles (1962) – Ariane
 Bahía de Palma (1962) – Olga
 The Phone Rings Every Night (1962) – Tochter Mabel Meyer
 Les Bricoleurs (1963) – Brigitte
 Ostrva (1963) – Eva
 The Victors (1963) – Helga Metzger
 ...denn die Musik und die Liebe in Tirol (1963)
 The Prize (1963) – Inger Lisa Andersson
 A Shot in the Dark (1964) – Maria Gambrelli
 Among Vultures (1964) – Annie Dillman
 Le bambole (1965, UK title: Four Kinds of Love) – Ulla (segment "Il Trattato di Eugenetica")
 The Art of Love (1965) – Nikki Dunnay
 The Money Trap (1965) – Lisa Baron
 Hotel der toten Gäste (1965) – Herself
 The Oscar (1966) – Kay Bergdahl
 Boy, Did I Get a Wrong Number! (1966) – Didi
 The Venetian Affair (1966) – Sandra Fane
 The Peking Medallion (1967, a.k.a. The Corrupt Ones) – Lilly Mancini
 Deadlier Than the Male (1967) – Irma Eckman
 The Wicked Dreams of Paula Schultz (1968) – Paula Schultz
 They Came to Rob Las Vegas (1968) – Ann Bennett
 The Wrecking Crew (1969) – Linka Karensky
 The Invincible Six (1970) – Zari
 Percy (1971) – Helga
 Zeppelin (1971) – Erika Altschul
 Probe (1972, TV movie) – Heideline 'Uli' Ullman
 Baron Blood (1972) – Eva Arnold
 Trip to Vienna (1973) – Toni Simon
   The Tonight Show with Johnny Carson (1973) Herself - Guest
 Lisa and the Devil (1973) – Lisa Reiner / Elena
 One or the Other of Us (1974) – Miezi
 Percy's Progress (1974) – Clarissa
 Ten Little Indians (1974, also known as And Then There Were None) – Vera Clyde
 Carry On Behind (1975) – Professor Anna Vooshka
 The Net (1975) – Christa Sonntag
 The Swiss Conspiracy (1976) – Rita Jensen
 Meet Him and Die (1976) – Perrone's Secretary
 One Away (1976) – Elsa
 The Astral Factor (1978) – Chris Hartman (re-released as The Invisible Strangler in 1984)
 I Miss You, Hugs and Kisses (1978, also known as Drop Dead Dearest) – Magdalene Kruschen
 The Prisoner of Zenda (1979) – The Countess
 Stunt Seven (1979, TV movie) – Rebecca Wayne
 The Double McGuffin (1979) – Madame Kura
 The Treasure Seekers (1979) – Ursula
 A Nightingale Sang in Berkeley Square (1979) – Miss Pelham
 Top of the Hill (1980, TV movie) – Eva Heggener
 Exit Sunset Boulevard (1980) – Frau Lachmann
 The Man in Pyjamas (1981) – Frau Lachmann
 Inside the Third Reich (1982, TV movie) – Magda Goebbels
 Lily in Love (1984) – Alicia Braun
  (1984) – Lou Parker
 Jenny's War (1985, TV series) – Eva Gruenberg
 The Exciting World Of Speed And Beauty (syndicated; 1980s) - Herself
 Peter the Great (1986, TV mini-series) – Charlotte
 St. Elsewhere (1986, TV series) – Natasha
 Anastasia: The Mystery of Anna (1986, TV movie) – Isabel Von Hohenstauffen
 Death Stone (1987) – Kris Patterson
 Adventures Beyond Belief (1988, TV series) – Headmistress Bruno von Kleff
 Himmelsheim (1988) – Helga Münzel
 Severed Ties (1992) – Helena Harrison
 Counterstrike (1992, TV series) – Anita Duvalier
 Happy Holiday (1993, TV series) – Isabella Scattini
 Destiny Ridge (1993, TV series) – Anna
 Florian III (1994, TV series) – Sonja Carpenter
 Life Is a Bluff (1996) – Jutta
 Double Game with Anne – Gotta have it (1998)
 Gisbert (1999, TV series)
 Doppeltes Spiel mit Anne (1999) – Frau Lorenz
  (2000) – Frau Lust
 Nicht mit uns (2000, TV movie) – Andrea Paretti
 Reblaus (2005, TV movie) – Maria Rüppel
 Ewig rauschen die Gelder (2005, TV movie) – Frau von Korff
  (2010) – Alfi Seliger's mother
 A Thousand Kisses (2017, animated short) – Nette (voice)

References

External links 
 
 Elke Sommer at Virtual History
 Elke Sommer at the German Dubbing Card Index

1940 births
20th-century German actresses
21st-century German actresses
Actresses from Berlin
German baronesses
German women singers
German film actresses
German Lutherans
German television actresses
Living people
Musicians from Berlin
New Star of the Year (Actress) Golden Globe winners
People from Erlangen